Lance Robertson, also known as "DJ Lance Rock", is an American musician, singer, DJ, and actor best known for the Nickelodeon show Yo Gabba Gabba!. He was nominated for two NAACP Image Awards.

Life and career
Originally from St. Louis, Robertson graduated from Hazelwood East High School in 1983. He was the vocalist for a local electronic band called "My Other Self" in the 1990s and the owner of a record store called "Deep Grooves!". 

Robertson later relocated to Los Angeles, California. During this time, he was in the band "The Ray Makers". He later met Scott Schultz of the Orange County indie pop band Majestic. They eventually played a couple of shows together. Years later, when Schultz was co-creating the show Yo Gabba Gabba!, Robertson was asked to serve as host DJ Lance Rock.

In addition to appearing on Yo Gabba Gabba!, Robertson tours with The Aquabats performing kid-friendly DJ sets and dancing with the cast of the Gabbaland creatures. He and his wife Kendra live in Los Angeles.

Filmography

Film

Television

Awards and nominations 

!
|-
|align=center|2011
|Himself
|NAACP Image Award for Outstanding Performance in a Youth/ Children’s Program (Series or Special)
|
|
|-
|align=center|2012
|Himself
|NAACP Image Award for Outstanding Performance in a Youth/ Children’s Program (Series or Special)
|
|
|-

References

External links

 Monster Mash-Ups - article on the creation of Yo Gabba Gabba

Living people
Male actors from St. Louis
21st-century American male actors
American DJs
Year of birth missing (living people)
21st-century American male musicians